Aeros has multiple uses:

 Houston Aeros (WHA), a World Hockey Association team that played between 1972 and 1978
 Houston Aeros (1994–2013), a team that played first in the International Hockey League and then the American Hockey League between 1994 and 2013
 Akron Aeros, Minor League Baseball team
 Aeros, Ukrainian aircraft manufacturer building hang gliders
 Aeros (motorcycle), 1920's Czechoslovakian motorcycle
 AEROS (satellite), US satellite for atmospheric research
 Worldwide Aeros Corporation, US projector of the Aeroscraft ML 866, hybrid airship
 Aeros (Flight training school), flying training school based at Coventry Airport
 AEROS (operating system), a hybrid distribution of AROS and Linux computer operating systems